Tung Kok Wai, also known as Ling Kok Wai, is a walled village in Lung Yeuk Tau, Fanling, Hong Kong. It is one of the Five Wai (walled villages) and Six Tsuen (villages) in Lung Yeuk Tau.

Administration
Tung Kok Wai is one of the villages represented within the Fanling District Rural Committee. For electoral purposes, Tung Kok Wai is part of the Queen's Hill constituency, which is currently represented by Law Ting-tak.

Tung Kok Wai, as part of Lung Yeuk Tau, is a recognized village under the New Territories Small House Policy.

Conservation
Tung Kok Wai is located along the Lung Yeuk Tau Heritage Trail. The walled village is listed as a Grade I historic building of Hong Kong.

See also
 Walled villages of Hong Kong

References

External links

 Delineation of area of existing village Lung Yeuk Tau (Fanling) for election of resident representative (2019 to 2022) (includes Tung Kok Wai)
 Antiquities and Monuments Office. Hong Kong Traditional Chinese Architectural Information System. Tung Kok Wai
 Antiquities and Monuments Office. Historic Building Appraisal. Tung Kok Wai. Pictures

Walled villages of Hong Kong
Grade I historic buildings in Hong Kong
Lung Yeuk Tau
Villages in North District, Hong Kong